MIMO is an acronym for Multiple-Input and Multiple-Output, a method for multiplying the capacity of a radio link.

MIMO or mimo may also refer to:

 Miami Modern architecture, an architectural style
 MiMo District, Miami, Florida, US
 Vicente Reynés Mimó (born 1981), Spanish cyclist
 Musical Instrument Museums Online, a project; see Hornbostel–Sachs
 "Mimo-", a prefix used in taxonomy to mean mimicking
 Milano Monza Open-Air Motor Show, an annual auto show

See also

 MIMOS, a Malaysian R&D organisation
 MIMOS II, an instrument used on the Mars exploration rovers